Wishmaster is the third studio album by Finnish symphonic metal band Nightwish. It was released on 8 May 2000 through Spinefarm Records in Finland. The album was released in the rest of Europe by Drakkar Entertainment on 29 May, and in Japan by Toy's Factory on 19 July. In the US, it was released by Century Media on 6 February 2001.

Wishmaster peaked at No. 1 in the official Finnish charts; the album also debuted in the European charts at No. 21 in Germany and No. 66 in France. Wishmaster has sold more than 79,447 copies in Finland alone. In 2019, Metal Hammer ranked it as the 18th best power metal album of all time.

Most reissues of the album contain the song "Sleepwalker", which was released in July 2000 to compete in the Finnish national final for the Eurovision Song Contest 2000.

Background and release
The writing and recording of Wishmaster was very fast and devoid of complications, in contrast with what had happened for Oceanborn. The main composer Tuomas Holopainen considers the album "the most distant and least personal (...) in the Nightwish catalogue", despite containing the "mother of all Nightwish songs - Dead Boys' Poem." The image of the dead boy would reappear in several songs of the following albums. Wishmaster was issued on 8 May 2000, a few days earlier than its scheduled release, because the music had leaked onto the Internet.

Music style
Wishmasters sound continues the bombastic symphonic power metal approach originally featured on Oceanborn, albeit with more emphasis on atmosphere and melody versus speed and heaviness. Perhaps even more so than its predecessor, Wishmaster has a very clear fantasy theme. While commonly considered to be closer to conventional power metal, there is still a great variety with slower songs like "Two for Tragedy" and "Dead Boy's Poem", and more epic pieces like  "FantasMic". "The Kinslayer" is written about the victims of the Columbine High School massacre. "Wishmaster" was inspired by the fantasy novel series The Lord of the Rings and Dragonlance, mentioning Elbereth, Lórien, and the Grey Havens from the former; and Dalamar, Raistlin Majere (Dalamar's shalafi, or "master"), Gilthanas, the Sla-Mori, Silvara and the Inn of the Last Home from the latter. "FantasMic" is a song about the Disney animated movies, particularly their fantasy and fable elements, taking its title from the Disneyland show Fantasmic!.

Track listing

Personnel
Credits for Wishmaster adapted from liner notes.NightwishTarja Turunen – vocals
Tuomas Holopainen – keyboards, lyrics, songwriting
Emppu Vuorinen – guitars, songwriting
Sami Vänskä – bass
Jukka Nevalainen – drums, percussionAdditional musiciansIke Vil – spoken words in "The Kinslayer"
Sam Hardwick – spoken words in "Dead Boy's Poem"
Esa Lehtinen – flute
Matias Kaila – tenor vocals
Kimmo Kallio – baritone vocals
Riku Salminen – bass vocals
Anssi Honkanen – bass vocals
Ville Laaksonen – tenor vocals, choir arrangementsProduction'
Tero Kinnunen – producer, engineering, recording
Mikko Karmila – engineer, mixing, recording
Mika Jussila – mastering
Toni Härkönen – photography
Maria Sandell – artwork
Peter Dell – artwork, layout
Markus Mayer – cover art

Charts

Album

Singles

Certifications

References

Bibliography

External links
Nightwish's Official Website

2000 albums
Century Media Records albums
Nightwish albums
Spinefarm Records albums